Emamqoli Kandi may refer to:
 Emamqoli Kandi-ye Olya
 Emamqoli Kandi-ye Sofla